The Lampies is a British 2000-2002 animated children's television series created by David Bonner and features a mix of 2D and 3D animation.

Created by David Bonner in conjunction with Uli Meyer Animation Studios and music by Mcasso Music, there are 50 eleven-minute episodes that were originally commissioned by the BBC. Financial issues caused the creative and business drive to falter and momentum was lost. In 2003 The Lampies IP was bought from the receiver by a private investor. Surviving episodes of The Lampies remain available on VHS and DVD in the United Kingdom.

Plot
A group of sprite-like power engineers maintain and defend the lamp post H032 which is the critical area of the entire Lighting Network. The Roons, who live in the sewers below, are the creatures who plan to threaten the Lighting Network due to their strong dislike to the presence of light. Sewer rats can also prove to be a pest to the Lampies.

Characters and Voice Cast

The Lampies Crew
Burnout (voiced by Jimmy Hibbert) – The laid back Foreman of the Lampies who has to run scheduled switches for the lamp light. He has green skin, white hair and wears a blue jumpsuit.
Spotlight (voiced by Eve Karpf) – The routine inspector of the Lampies. She acts like mother to the other Lampies. She has green skin, lavender hair and (mostly) wears a pink jumpsuit.
Charge (voiced by Rob Rackstraw) – The clumsy, day-dreaming assistant worker of the Lampies. He is the most prone to problems. He has blue skin, blue hair and wears a yellow jumpsuit. There is a running gag involving Charge falling into control room through the hole in the ceiling.
Contact (voiced by Susan Sheridan) – The serious and sensible computer operator of the Lampies. She has reddish skin, red hair and wears a yellow jumpsuit.
Livewire (voiced by Susan Sheridan) – The cute and feisty young girl of the Lampies, who is Dustywugg the Dog's owner as well as Contact's niece. She has pale pink skin, pink hair, speaks in a high-pitched voice, and (most of the time) wears a hot, red jumpsuit. She is often pushed around by the grown-ups, nevertheless she saves the day several times.
Dustywugg the Dog (voiced by Jimmy Hibbert) – A furry sprite who serves as the Lampies' pet and mascot. He has orange fur and can be quite cheeky, although his owner, Livewire, enjoys playing with him whenever she can.
Captain Bright Light (voiced by Jimmy Hibbert) – The absent-minded captain of the Lampies. He has pale skin, brown hair and wears a green jumpsuit. He has an older brother, Flash Light, who is bigger and stronger, yet not as brave as Bright Light.

Antagonists
The Roons (voiced by Rob Rackstraw) – A large group of green-faced creatures, who live in the sewers below the Lampies world. They are afraid of light (even when it comes to small flashlights) and constantly try to break all the streetlights around.
Arch Roon (voiced by Jimmy Hibbert) – The leader of the Roons who mostly stays in the yard, even though he doesn't show any signs of fear of the light. The only person he actually fears is his mother.

Other Characters
Brigadier Big Beam (voiced by Jimmy Hibbert) – The superior organiser of the Lighting Network. He has purple skin, white hair and wears a green uniform.
Phosphorous (voiced by Eve Karpf) – The Brigadier's officer liaison and Charge's love interest. She has pale skin, brown hair and wears yellow shirt and red skirt.
Captain Spentflint – Formerly the Lampies' captain and now retired. Criticised as a slave driver.
Spark (voiced by Rob Rackstraw) – The keeper of a bike light. People like him are called Bikeys.
Neon – A one-off character for the show's series 2 opener - features in the "Light Up the World For Christmas" single. 
Haywire (voiced by Rob Rackstraw) – A one-off character in series 1 episode 11 "Bouncer" who is Burnout's cousin, living in Lamppost HY11 in sector 14.
Bouncer (voiced by Eve Karpf) – The chattering, gossiping green grasshopper who has blue eyes. She only appears in Series 1 Episode 11 "Bouncer" and is mentioned by quite a few of the main Lampies members, including Burnout.

Episodes

Series 1

Series 2

Reception
TV distribution rights for Series One were sold into 33 countries. When series one was broadcast in 2001 it regularly achieved over 40% of target viewing audience. This figure reached over 50% during 2002. Series two of The Lampies was completed in March 2002 and generated similar audience figures with prime slots on BBC 1 and 2.

Releases
HIT Entertainment released a single UK-only VHS tape release of the programme entitled "Captain Who and Other Stories" in 2001.

After the sale of the series to LP Productions, the company began relaunching the series. An introductory DVD – Switch Onto the Lampies was launched on 7 April 2008. A full DVD release containing the first half of the first series - "A Bit of A Jam and Other Stories", was released on 19 May 2008.

LP Productions formed a partnership with Save the Children in 2008, where £2 from the sale of the introductory DVD went towards the Save the Children protection work.

References

External links

The Lampies at toonhound.com
Uli Meyer Animation Studios (TV section)

2000 British television series debuts
2002 British television series endings
2000s British animated television series
2000s British children's television series
BBC children's television shows
British children's animated comedy television series
British children's animated fantasy television series
Television series by Mattel Creations
Television about fairies and sprites
Fictional anthropomorphic characters
Fictional species and races
English-language television shows